Claude Silbert Hudson (January 26, 1881 – December 27, 1952) was an American chemist who is best known for his work in the area of carbohydrate chemistry.  He is also the namesake of the Claude S. Hudson Award in Carbohydrate Chemistry given by the American Chemical Society.

Life and work 

Hudson was born in Atlanta, Georgia in 1881. Originally planning to become a minister, he enrolled in Princeton University, but soon his interests changed to science. He graduated from Princeton in 1901 with a bachelor's degree, and earned a Master of Science degree in 1902. He then went to Europe to study under Walther Nernst and Jacobus Henricus van 't Hoff. On returning to the United States, Hudson worked as a physics instructor for a year at Princeton University and later at the University of Illinois, earning a Ph.D. in 1907. He later held positions at the National Bureau of Standards and the NIH (1928 – 1951), both in Washington, DC.

He was elected to the National Academy of Sciences in 1927.

Hudson is also remembered for the so-called Hudson's rules, concerning the optical rotation of sugars.

He was awarded the Elliott Cresson Medal in 1942 and the Willard Gibbs Award in 1929.

Selected early writings

Claude S. Hudson Award 

The Claude S. Hudson Award in Carbohydrate Chemistry has been given since 1946 by the American Chemical Society.  Awardees are listed below.

 2009 Peter H. Seeberger
 2007 Pierre Sinaÿ
 2005 David R. Bundle
 2003 Robert J. Linhardt
 2001 Yuan-Chuan Lee
 1999 Chi-Huey Wong
 1997 Samuel J. Danishefsky
 1995 Tomoya Ogawa
 1994 Hans Vliegenthart
 1993 Irwin J. Goldstein
 1992 Akira Kobata
 1991 Per J. Garegg
 1990 Bertram O. Fraser-Reid
 1989 Walter A. Szarek
 1988 Leslie Hough
 1987 Stephen J. Angyal
 1986 Gerald O. Aspinall
 1985 Hans Paulsen
 1984 Laurens Anderson
 1983 Bengt Lindberg
 1982 Stephen Hanessian
 1981 Clinton E. Ballou
 1980 George A. Jeffrey
 1979 Arthur S. Perlin
 1978 Michael Heidelberger
 1977 Jack J. Fox
 1976 Sidney M. Cantor
 1975 Hans H. Baer
 1974 Wendell W. Binkley
 1973 Roger W. Jeanloz
 1972 Derek Horton
 1971 Robert S. Tipson
 1970 Norman F. Kennedy
 1969 John K. Netherton Jones
 1968 Hewitt G. Fletcher Jr.
 1967 W. Z. Hassid
 1966 Raymond U. Lemieux
 1965 C. G. Caldwell
 1964 Dexter French
 1963 Nelson K. Richtmyer
 1962 Fred Smith
 1961 John C. Sowden
 1960 Roy L. Whistler
 1959 W. Ward Pigman
 1958 Hermann O. L. Fischer
 1957 Julian K. Dale
 1956 James M. D. Brown
 1955 Kenneth R. Brown
 1954 Horace S. Isbell
 1953 George P. Meade
 1952 Melville L. Wolfrom
 1951 William D. Horne
 1950 William B. Newkirk
 1949 Frederick W. Zerban
 1947 Frederick J. Bates
 1946 Claude S. Hudson

Further reading 
 Biographical Information
 The Collected Papers of C. S. Hudson (1946, volume I; 1948, volume II), New York: Academic Press

External links 
 Claude S. Hudson Award in Carbohydrate Chemistry
 Preservation of Hudson's equipment

1881 births
1952 deaths
20th-century American chemists